Stig-Arne Gunnestad (born 12 February 1962) is a Norwegian curler and Olympic medalist. He received a bronze medal at the 1998 Winter Olympics in Nagano.

He was part of the team that finished second at the 1992 Winter Olympics where curling was a demonstration sport.

References

External links

 

1962 births
Living people
Norwegian male curlers
Olympic curlers of Norway
Curlers at the 1992 Winter Olympics
Curlers at the 1998 Winter Olympics
Olympic bronze medalists for Norway
Olympic medalists in curling
Medalists at the 1998 Winter Olympics
20th-century Norwegian people